The Cima del Rosso is a mountain of Pennine Alps, located on the border between Switzerland and Italy. It lies between the Val Divedro (Valais) and the Valle di Bognanco (Piedmont), east of the Portjengrat.

References

External links
 Cima del Rosso on Hikr

Mountains of the Alps
Mountains of Piedmont
Mountains of Valais
Italy–Switzerland border
International mountains of Europe
Mountains of Switzerland
Two-thousanders of Switzerland